Urmila Matondkar is an Indian actress known for her work in Hindi films. She has appeared in over 60 films. She has been praised by the critics for her acting and dancing skills. She made her screen debut as a child artist in B.R. Chopra's Karm (1977),   and later appeared in Shekhar Kapur's critically acclaimed Masoom (1983). After making her debut as the heroine in 1989 Malayalam thriller Chanakyan, Urmila began a full-time acting career, with a leading role in the 1991 action Narsimha. She rose to prominence with Ram Gopal Varma's blockbuster Rangeela (1995). Her portrayal of an aspiring actress, Mili Joshi, opposite Aamir Khan received praise from critics, and garnered her first nomination for the Filmfare Award for Best Actress.

In 1997, Urmila received a nomination for Filmfare Award for Best Supporting Actress for her performance in the drama Judaai. The following year, she starred in the crime drama Satya, which has been cited as one of the greatest films of Indian cinema, for which she received another nomination for Best Actress. The same year, her dance performance in the item number "Chamma Chamma" from China Gate won her rave reviews. In 1999, she received praise for playing a psychopath in the thriller Kaun and a reserved girl in the romantic comedy Khoobsurat, a box office success. Her other four releases of the year including Jaanam Samjha Karo, and Hum Tum Pe Marte Hain were commercial failures. She played an obsessive lover in the 2001 romantic drama Pyaar Tune Kya Kiya, which earned her a nomination for the Filmfare Award for Best Performance in a Negative Role.

From 2003 to 2005, Urmila starred in six consecutive films that garnered her widespread critical acclaim. In 2003, she played a possessed woman in the commercially successful horror film Bhoot, which won her the Filmfare Critics Award for Best Actress. Later the same year, she starred in the drama Tehzeeb and the period drama Pinjar, based on the partition of India. The role of a violent avenger in the 2004 neo-noir Ek Hasina Thi garnered her several Best Actress nominations, including Filmfare. In 2005, she starred in the horror Naina and the drama Maine Gandhi Ko Nahin Mara. This was followed by a series of commercial failures, including Speed (2007), and Karzzzz (2008). Her first leading role in Marathi cinema came with the 2014 drama Ajoba, in which she played a wildlife photographer. In addition to her acting career, she has featured as a talent judge for Sony TV's Jhalak Dikhhla Jaa Season 2, Colors' Chak Dhoom Dhoom and Zee Marathi's Dance Maharashtra Dance.

Films

Television

See also
 List of awards and nominations received by Urmila Matondkar

Notes

References

External links

 
 Urmila Matondkar on Bollywood Hungama

Indian filmographies
Actress filmographies